Eric Frederick Skrmetta (born October 1, 1958) is an American politician who represents District 1 (largely surburban New Orleans, eastern Florida Parishes, and River Parishes) on the Louisiana Public Service Commission (PSC), an influential regulatory agency which was the political springboard for former governors Huey Long, Jimmie Davis, and John McKeithen. Commissioner Skrmetta was born 1958 October 1 in New Orleans. Skrmetta is a member of the Republican Party.

Education and background
After finishing Brother Martin High School in New Orleans, Skrmetta attended Louisiana State University,  where in 1981 he received his B.S. degree in industrial technology. In 1985 he was a cum laude graduate (juris doctor) of Southern University School of Law, passed the Louisiana Bar Exam, and entered the practice of law.  In 1986 Skrmetta received his LL.M. in admiralty law from Tulane University Law School. Since 1989 he has focused on legal mediation. A member of the Louisiana Republican State Central Committee for District 81, in 2003 he unsuccessfully sought to represent the coterminous District 81 in the Louisiana House of Representatives.

Election 2008
Skrmetta won the race for Public Service Commissioner in a 2008 November 4 runoff after two other candidates (Bruce Kincade and Ken Odinet Sr.) were eliminated in the primary election.  His runoff opponent was former Public Service Commissioner John F. Schwegmann, who had no party affiliation. Skrmetta had the support of then-incumbent District 1 commissioner Jay Blossman, who was barred by term limits from seeking reelection. Skrmetta assumed his commissionership office on 2009 January 1 for a term which ends on 2014 December 31. Skrmetta’s campaign demonstrated the political utility of open web sites such as Facebook.

Public Service Commissioner
On PSC Skrmetta has sought clarification of Louisiana’s ethics regulations, which have tightened since the state’s populistic past. In particular he has sought to displace meal reimbursements to commissioners from regulated utility companies with reimbursements by PSC itself.

Personal life
Eric Skrmetta and his wife Deborah Gibson Skrmetta (born 1961) have two children. The Skrmettas are involved in various religious and community organizations. They live in Metairie, Louisiana, where they attend Saint Catherine of Siena Catholic Church.

Notes

1958 births
Living people
American Roman Catholics
Louisiana lawyers
Louisiana Republicans
Louisiana State University alumni
Members of the Louisiana Public Service Commission
People from Jefferson Parish, Louisiana
People from New Orleans
Southern University alumni
Southern University Law Center alumni
Tulane University alumni
Tulane University Law School alumni
2020 United States presidential electors